delta-Nonalactone is a chemical compound found in bourbon whiskey.

See also
 γ-Nonalactone

References

Delta-lactones